The 1965 New Mexico State Aggies football team was an American football team that represented New Mexico State University as an independent during the 1965 NCAA University Division football season. In their eighth year under head coach Warren B. Woodson, the Aggies compiled an 8–2 record and outscored opponents by a total of 236 to 153. The team played its four home games at Memorial Stadium in Las Cruces, New Mexico.

The team's statistical leaders included quarterback Sal Olivas with 594 passing yards, running back Jim Bohl with 1,191 rushing yards, and wide receiver Hartwell Menefee with 571 receiving yards.

The crowd of 29,052 that attended the October 2 rivalry game with Texas Western was the largest to attend a sporting event in El Paso, Texas, up to that date. The following month, the crowd of 17,500 that attended the rivalry game with New Mexico was the largest to attend a football game in Las Cruces.

Schedule

References

New Mexico State Aggies
New Mexico State Aggies football seasons
New Mexico State Aggies football